Foxcroft may refer to:

Places
Foxcroft, a former city now part of Dover-Foxcroft, Maine
Foxcroft Academy, in Dover-Foxcroft, Maine
Foxcroft School, in Middleburg, Virginia

People
Charles Foxcroft
Ezechiel Foxcroft
George Foxcroft
H. C. Foxcroft
Robert Foxcroft
 Thomas Foxcroft (minister)
 Thomas Foxcroft (slave trader)
 Vicky Foxcroft, British Labour Party politician

English-language surnames